Phlyctenactis tuberculosa, common name the wandering sea anemone or swimming anemone, is a species of sea anemone in the family Actiniidae. It is native to shallow seas around Australia and New Zealand. It was first described by the French zoologist Jean René Constant Quoy and the French naturalist Joseph Paul Gaimard. They were naval surgeons in the French Navy who amassed sizable collections of various organisms while traveling.

Description
This anemone is covered with bubble-like sacks, and comes in a variety of colours from brownish orange, mauve, light grey to brown in colour. The tentacles are lighter, and may be pale yellow, grey, brown or orange-yellow in colour. During the day, it remains bundled together, appearing like a ball of baked beans.

Habitat and behaviour
This is a nocturnal species, living in moderately exposed areas and among sheltered reefs at depths to 35 metres. It attaches to rock, seagrasses and kelp, but is able to detach its pedal disc, and is commonly found drifting on the sea floor. It moves about on the seabed by creeping with its basal disc, and at night climbs sea grasses or algae to find a better location to intercept prey floating past.

Distribution
This species occurs in Western Australia, Victoria, New South Wales, Tasmania, and New Zealand.

Venom
The wandering sea anemone is venomous and touching the tentacles can cause a painful sting. Swimmers are advised to avoid touching the sea anemone and to wear protective clothing.

References

External links
 Image

Actiniidae
Animals described in 1833
Taxa named by Jean René Constant Quoy
Taxa named by Joseph Paul Gaimard
Cnidarians of the Indian Ocean
Cnidarians of the Pacific Ocean